The National Task Force on AIDS Prevention (NTFAP) was founded in 1985 as a "National Minority Organization dedicated to ending the HIV epidemic by advocating for and assisting in the development of HIV education and service programs by and for gay and bisexual men of color." The NTFAP was created to provide support to gay men of color who did not identify with prevailing HIV/AIDS programs and education campaigns, which mainly targeted white gay men. The importance of the NTFAP began to emerge in the 1980s when the rate of infection in communities of color was rapidly increasing compared to white communities. The goals of the task force have been to guarantee the local gay men were targeted by HIV/AIDS preventive services. The NTFAP aimed to create culturally relevant propaganda that would help slow the rate of infection in communities of color. While the work done by the NTFAP stayed in the local San Francisco area, the intent of the organization was to set an example for the nation to follow in creating preventive services that crossed ethnic and cultural lines.


History
"If they're not going to do it [prevention for gay men of color], then goddamn it, we can do it ourselves. We're not crippled! We have power. That's why we created the National Task Force on AIDS Prevention – to do it for ourselves." -Reggie Williams The National Task Force on AIDS Prevention started as a project of the National Association of Black and White Men Together (NABWMT). In 1988 a group of NABWMT board members, including Reggie Williams, James Credle, Steve Feeback, Tom Horan, and John Teamer submitted a proposal to the National AIDS Information and Education Program of the Centers for Disease Control and Prevention. They were awarded $200,000 to start NTFAP which, among other activities, would coordinate the AIDS education efforts of local NABWMT around the country. Reggie Williams served as the Executive Director of NTFAP from its birth until his retirement in February 1994. Randy Miller succeeded Williams, and was later replaced as head of the organization by Mario Solis-Marich, who served as CEO.  In 1996, Angel Fabian co-organized the National Task Force on AIDS Prevention's first Gay/Bisexual Young Men of Color Summit at Gay Men of Color Conference, Miami, Florida.  It closed in June 1998.

References

External links
 See more at: Home | Division of Prevention Science

HIV/AIDS organizations in the United States
HIV/AIDS prevention organizations
Gay men's organizations
Organizations for LGBT people of color
Men's organizations in the United States
Non-profit organizations based in San Francisco
Organizations established in 1985
1985 establishments in the United States